In the Heat of the Sun is a 1994 Chinese film directed and written by Jiang Wen. The film is based loosely on author Wang Shuo's novel Wild Beast. Jiang Wen, known as one of China’s best actors and seen in numerous films such as Red Sorghum (1988), Hibiscus Town (1987), The Imperial Eunuch (1991), and Letter from An Unknown Woman (2004), is also a very successful filmmaker and director.

In the Heat of the Sun was Jiang Wen's first foray into directing after years as a leading actor. In the film, Jiang Wen utilized eroticism to restructure the discourse of Maoist China. The romantic and nostalgic representation of history is evident through the sensual narrative as well as the sexual experience of the film’s characters at the height of the Cultural Revolution.

Synopsis
The film is set in the early 1970s in Beijing, during the Cultural Revolution. It is told from the perspective of Ma Xiaojun, a teenage boy nicknamed "Monkey" (played by Xia Yu, some of Monkey's experiences mimic director Jiang's during the Revolution), Monkey and his friends are free to roam the streets of Beijing day and night because the local school system is non-functional and the Cultural Revolution has caused their parents to be either busy or away.

Most of the story happens during the summer and revolves around Monkey's dalliances, his friendship with a group of roguish boys, and his subsequent angst-filled crush on an older girl, Mi Lan (Ning Jing).

Monkey has a homemade skeleton key which he uses to sneak into people's apartments during his free time. After randomly entering Mi Lan's apartment, Monkey sees a photo of Mi Lan smiling in a swimming suit and becomes deeply attracted to her. He spends his days in the vicinity of her home, and when he finally spots Mi Lan on the streets, he strikes up a conversation with her. Monkey befriends her and they occasionally spend time together. After Monkey introduces Mi Lan to his friends, she becomes a part of their group, and despite Monkey's feelings for her, Mi Lan falls for Monkey's friend, Liu Yiku (Geng Le). Monkey's friends ostracize him after he attempts to rape Mi Lan in her apartment. Two months later, Mi Lan and Monkey's former friends stop hanging out with each other and they each go their own separate ways. The film ends with Monkey and his friends reuniting as adults.

Production
The film was a co-production between three Chinese studios, and US$2 million (about $ when adjusted for inflation) of the budget was generated from Hong Kong. Derek Elley of Variety said that the film alters "some 70% of the original" novel and adds "a mass of personal memories." Daniel Vukovich, author of China and Orientalism: Western Knowledge Production and the PRC, wrote that the film version makes its characters "a small group of male friends, plus one female "comrade"" instead of being "violent hooligans".

The original title of the film may be translated as "Bright Sunny Days". In the Heat of the Sun was chosen as its international English title during a film festival in Taiwan as a less politicized name, to avoid the original title's positive association with the Cultural Revolution.

Before Jiang Wen's In the Heat of the Sun (1994), there are only 6 Cultural Revolution-themed movies. They are Chen Kaige's Bawang bieji (Farewell My Concubine) (1993), Tian Zhuangzhuang's Lan fengzheng (The Blue Kite) (1992), Zhang Yimou's Huozhe (To Live) (1994), Xie Jin's Tianyunshan chuanqi (Legend of Tianyun Mountain) (1980), Mu ma ren (The Herdsman) (1982) and Furong zhen (Hibiscus Town) (1986).

This film was shot by Gu Changwei, “The No.1 photographer in Mainland”, who was in charge of the main photography in Red Sorghum, Ju dou, Farewell My Concubine, and has been awarded Gold Rooster Award in China, Academy Award in BFA, and Kodak Photographer in Award Hawaii International Film Festival”

One of the two sponsors, a real estate company, withdrew before the start of filming due to the economic recession, and even several staff left during filming.

The movie production consumed a national record of 250,000 feet of film and it took nearly six months to shoot.

Liu Xiaoqing, the Executive producer had used his own money to pay the debts of the film crew.

Jean Louis Piel offered to help Jiang Wen's crew with the funds for mixing, light distribution, copy suppression after watching the initial cut of the film.

Initially, Jiang Wen played the role of Ma Xiaojun during the character's 30s, the final film was edited to be more than 4 hours. He was not satisfied with his performance and due to time limits, he discarded his part.

Release
The film approved domestic distribution after making five changes: mainly altering some of the dialogue, censoring passages where the protagonist is sexually aroused, and weakening the music "L'Internationale" during the alley fights with enhancing strong action sound effects. The film was later restored by Orange Sky Golden Harvest Entertainment in collaboration with Jiang Wen and screened as part of the Venice Classics section in the 70th Venice International Film Festival in 2013. The restored film includes some scenes excluded from the original version (128 minutes) and is about seven minutes longer.

Rearrangements
Jiang Wen did some rearrangements on role making to make this film closer to his experience rather than basing too much off of Wang Shuo's Wild Beast.

Jiang Wen explains (about rearrangements) that when turning a novel into film, the fidelity in the adaptation could be questionable. He made some changes but he had no intention to distinguish his film from Wild Beast.

Cast 
Han Dong – Ma Xiaojun, as a young boy
Xia Yu – Ma Xiaojun (teenage Monkey). Wendy Larson, author of From Ah Q to Lei Feng: Freud and Revolutionary Spirit in 20th Century China, wrote that the selection of "an awkward-looking boy" who "contrasts with the more conventional tall good looks" of Liu Yiku was clever on part of Jiang Wen, and that Xia Yu "portrays [Ma Xiaojun] as charmingly shy and mischievous in social relationships yet forceful and engaging in his emotions." The character has the nickname "Monkey" in the film version. "Monkey" was the nickname of director Jiang Wen. Derek Elley of Variety says that Xia as Xiaojun has "both an uncanny resemblance to Jiang himself and a likable combination of insolence and innocence."
Feng Xiaogang – Mr. Hu, the teacher
Geng Le – Liu Yiku, as a teenager
Jiang Wen – Ma Xiaojun, as an adult (incl. narration)
Ning Jing – Mi Lan
Tao Hong – Yu Beibei. In the beginning Yu Beibei accompanies the boys and gives rise to sexual tension amongst them, but after Mi Lan is introduced, Yu Beibei does not appear with the group until the second telling of the birthday party. Larson states that Yu Beibei "is a significant character" in the first part of the film and that her disappearance is a "persistent clue that all is not as it seems".
Shang Nan – Liu Sitian
Wang Hai – Big Ant
Liu Xiaoning – Liu Yiku, as an adult
Siqin Gaowa – Zhai Ru ( – Xiaojun's mother)
Wang Xueqi – Ma Wenzhong ( – Xiaojun's father)
Fang Hua – Old general
Dai Shaobo – Yang Gao
Zuo Xiaoqing – Zhang Xiaomei
Yao Erga – Fat fool (傻子; Shǎ zi)

Jiang Wen cast three youngsters with no acting experience but with notable athletic experiences: Xia Yu was the skateboarding champion in his hometown Qingdao, Tao Hong was a synchronized swimmer on the Chinese national team, while Zuo Xiaoqing was a rhythmic gymnast also on the Chinese national team. All three enrolled in professional acting schools within a year of the film's release (Xia and Tao went to Jiang's alma mater Central Academy of Drama, while Zuo was accepted to Beijing Film Academy) and became successful actors.

To make this film more realistic, the students in this film are mostly played by dropouts that are under 14 years old.

Trivia
Ma Xiaojun's character bears a strong likeness to Jiang Wen as well as to Wang Shuo, whose novella Wild Beasts provided the origin for Jiang's script. Xiaojun's family, like Jiang Wen's, is from the city of Taishan; the novella's author and the film director are the same age as the fictional Xiaojun and, like him, grew up in Beijing in the idiosyncratic environment of military family housing. Their parents worked for the Communist Party in military, political and scientific fields, so Jiang Wen and Wang Shuo lived in one of the more luxurious courtyards — and much like their characters — were known as the Most Privileged Young People of New China.

Due to Jiang Wen's background, he was able to avoid the typical images or language of the Cultural Revolution, such as Red Guards wielding Mao's Little Red Book. His film shows another side of life during the Cultural Revolution, where children dance and hold flowers together in the playground.

Xia Yu was appointed by Jiang Wen's mother to play the role of Ma Xiaojun, since he looked similar to Jiang's teenage image. The character Ma Xiaojun’s nickname in the movie was Jiang Wen’s own childhood moniker.

The script for the film In the Heat of the Sun is not Jiang Wen’s first script. He has previously worked uncredited on Red Sorghum (1988), Li Lianying: The Imperial Eunuch (1991) and Black Snow (1990).

Director Jiang Wen asked the photographer not to be a spectator but to be a role in the film, which posed a great challenge to the choice of viewpoints.

There are some interesting behind-the-scenes noted. One scene Jiang Wen presented in the movie on Ma’s memory has a hazy feel to emphasize Ma’s own recollection of the past rather than what actually happened. He used a Brechtian technique, in which the frame freezes while the narrator clears his mind, to let the audience notice a distinct frozen moment. Other than film techniques, the characters in this movie also brought freshness to mainland China-shot films, particularly the two independent-minded girls. The sexual frankness in the shower scene with the boys and the topless shot of actress Ning Jing paved the way for mainland China films. During the same period, rival-gang hooliganism and watching western films were also eye-opening.

Music
The Chinese version of the Soviet song "Moscow Nights" features prominently in the film, as does Pietro Mascagni's music for his opera Cavalleria Rusticana.

Pietro Mascagni’s “Cavalleria Rusticana Intermezzo” is often used as an independent symphony repertoire and as the soundtrack of famous movies, such as The Godfather III (1990) and Martin Scorsese's Raging Bull (1980). In the Heat of the Sun (1994) employs this music as the film enters into and throughout the main plot.

"The Internationale" (French: "L'Internationale") is used in the fighting scene between a group led by Liu Yiku and a group of shirtless teenagers. It is a left-wing anthem and has been a standard of the socialist movement since the late nineteenth century. It was used as a national anthem by the Chinese Soviet Republic. In an optimistic and heroic way, this music is used in the film In the Heat of the Sun during the revenge for Shazi by Liu Yiku and the others.

“Katyusha” (Russian:Катюша) is a 1938 Soviet folk-based song composed by Matnvey Blanter. It is a popular song sung in The People’s Republic of China due to influence from the Soviet Union in the 1950s after a treaty of alliance signed between the PRC and Soviet Union. In the Heat of the Sun utilizes this song as a background music during the celebration scene where the two opposing gangs end up drinking and getting along peacefully.

Jiang Wen uses many revolutionary songs including 'Chairman Mao, Revolutionary Soldiers Wish you a Long Life” (Mao Zhuxi, geming zhanshi zhu nin wan shou wu jiang), 'Missing Chairman Mao — the Savior' (Xiangnian enren Mao Zhuxi), 'Ode to Beijing' (Beijing songge) and 'Sun Shining on the Jinggang Mountain' (Jinggangshan shang taiyang hong).

Reception
Ranked number 98 non-English-speaking film in the critics' poll conducted by the BBC in 2018.

In contrast to the Cultural Revolution-set films of Chinese 5th-generation filmmakers (Zhang Yimou, Chen Kaige, Tian Zhuangzhuang) which put the era into a larger historical setting, In The Heat Of the Sun is mellow and dream-like, portraying memories of that era with somewhat positive and personal resonances. It also acknowledges, as the narrator recalls, that he might have misremembered parts of his adolescence as stated in the prologue: "Change has wiped out my memories. I can't tell what's imagined from what's real", as the director offers alternative or imagined versions of some events as people seek to romanticize their youthful memories.The film was commercially successful in China. Although In the Heat of the Sun was a successful film, many critics pointed out the nonconformist and jubilant take on the Cultural Revolution. Critic Raymond Zhou talked about the ambiguity in Jiang Wen's movies: "Ambiguity is a major characteristic. Since two of his four features wax nostalgic about the 'Cultural Revolution' (1966–76), a period that evokes painful memories for many Chinese…"

As a member of the liumang generation, too young to be sent to the countryside in the Culture Revolution yet old enough to have knowledge of life under Mao, Jiang has experienced the Maoist past, but has not been visibly scarred by it.

Vukovich wrote that the film however did cause some controversy in China for its perceived "nostalgic" and "positive" portrayal of the Cultural Revolution. For instance, “scar literature” writer Feng Jicai criticized the film as “indiscriminate nostalgia”, saying that he “regret[s] that the Cultural Revolution [In the Heat of the Sun] represents has nothing in common with [his]. Until now no film has truly represented the Cultural Revolution.” According to Vukovich, the film "received much less attention than any fifth-generation classics" despite the "critical appreciation in festivals abroad". Vukovich stated that in Western countries "the film has been subjected to an all too familiar coding as yet another secretly subversive, dissenting critique of Maoist and Cultural Revolution totalitarianism", with the exceptions being the analyses of Chen Xiaoming from Mainland China and Wendy Larson.

Reviews and critics
Immediately after the film's release, major critics praised it as the most important work in Chinese cinema since Zhang Yimou's Hong gaoliang (Red Sorghum) (1987). In the Heat of the Sun resonates with Zhang's film not only in reinventing cinematic language but also in retelling a key moment in China's history.

Awards and recognition
Well received in China and the Chinese-speaking world but very obscure in the United States, the film won the 51st Venice Film Festival's Best Actor Award for its young lead actor Xia Yu (Xia was then the youngest recipient of the Best Actor award at Venice) as well as the 33rd Golden Horse Awards in Taiwan for Best Feature, Best Director, Best Actor, Best Adapted Screenplay, Best Cinematography and Best Sound Editing. American director Quentin Tarantino also gave high praises to the film, calling it "really great."

It was the first People's Republic of China film to win Best Feature Film in the Golden Horse Awards; the very year where Chinese-language films from the mainland were first allowed to participate.

The film was a domestic box office hit in 1995, beating Hollywood blockbusters like The True Lies, Lion King and Forrest Gump.

References

Citations

Bibliography
 Bao, Ying. Remembering the invisible: Soundscape and memory of 1989, Journal of Chinese Cinemas, 2013, 7:3, 207–224, DOI: 10.1386/jcc.7.3.207_1
 Braester, Yomi. Memory at a standstill: 'Street-smart history' in Jiang Wen's In the Heat of the Sun. Screen, 2001. 42 (4): 350–362. doi:10.1093/screen/42.4.350. ISSN 0036-9543
 Jiang, Wen. ‘Yangguang zhong de jiyi: yi bu dianying de dansheng’/ ‘Recollections in the sun: The birth of a film’, Yibu dianying de dansheng/The Birth of a Film, Beijing: Huayi chubanshe, 1997. pp. 1–71. 
 Larson, Wendy. From Ah Q to Lei Feng: Freud and Revolutionary Spirit in 20th Century China. Stanford University Press, 2009. , 9780804769822.
 Li Junwei, "Structure and Strategy Evolution of Narrative in Jiang Wen’s film – Focus on ‘In The Heat of the Sun’, ‘The Sun Also Rises’, and ‘Let the Bullets Fly’", doi: 10. 3969 / j. issn. 1002 – 2236. 2016. 06. 023
 Qian Gao, "HIDDEN IN THE HEAT OF THE SUN: MIMESIS, SACRILEGE AND APORIA—READING JIANG WEN’S FILMIC RECREATION OF THE CHINESE CULTURAL REVOLUTION", University of Redlands, 30 April 2014
 Vukovich, Daniel. China and Orientalism: Western Knowledge Production and the PRC (Postcolonial Politics). Routledge, 17 June 2013. , 9781136505928.
 Wang Honghong, "The Interpretation and Innovation in Soundscape and Image in ‘The Heat of the Sun’".
 Xiao Shuang, "Jiang Wen Indulges in ‘The Heat of the Sun’", DOI：10.16583/j.cnki.52-1014/j.1994.09.046
 Zou, Hongyan, and Peter C Pugsley. “Chinese Films and the Sense of Place: Beijing as ‘Thirdspace’ from In the Heat of the Sun to Mr Six.” Making Publics, Making Places, edited by Mary Griffiths and Kim Barbour, University of Adelaide Press, South Australia, 2016, pp. 111–128. JSTOR, www.jstor.org/stable/10.20851/j.ctt1t304qd.12. Accessed 13 June 2020.

Further reading
 Qi Wang. "Writing Against Oblivion: Personal Filmmaking from the Forsaken Generation in Post-socialist China." (dissertation) ProQuest, 2008. , 9780549900689. p. 149–152.
 Silbergeld, Jerome (2008), Body in Question: Image and Illusion in Two Chinese Films by Director Jiang Wen (Princeton: Princeton University Press)
 Su, Mu (Beijing Film Academy). Sunny Teenager: A Review of the Movie in the Heat of the Sun. Strategic Book Publishing, 2013. , 9781625165084. See page at Google Books.

External links 

 
 
 Braester, Yomi. "Memory at a standstill: 'street-smart history' in Jiang Wen's In the Heat of the Sun." Screen 42:4 Winter 2001.
 Lu, Tonglin. "Fantasy and Ideology in a Chinese Film: A Žižekian Reading of the Cultural Revolution." Project MUSE. (pdf version)
 Williams, Louise. "Men in the Mirror : Questioning Masculine Identities in In the Heat of the Sun." China Information 2003 17: 92 . (Archive)
 "In The Heat of The Sun, directed by Jiang Wen, China 1994." (Archive). Wooster University.
 (hk) 陽光燦爛的日子 at the Hong Kong Movie Database, hkmd.com Inc
 "A truth that's stranger than fiction."

1994 films
1990s Mandarin-language films
Films based on Chinese novels
Films set in Beijing
Films about the Cultural Revolution
Films directed by Jiang Wen
Films whose director won the Best Director Golden Horse Award
Films with screenplays by Wang Shuo
Chinese drama films
1994 directorial debut films
Films scored by Guo Wenjing